Post-Vatican II Mass may refer to:

 Preconciliar rites after the Second Vatican Council
 Mass of Paul VI
 Zaire Use